Air Enthusiast was a  British, bi-monthly, aviation magazine, published by the Key Publishing group. Initially begun in 1974 as Air Enthusiast Quarterly, the magazine was conceived as a historical adjunct to Air International magazine.  Air International was (and still is) involved with current aviation topics and the Quarterly concerned itself with historical matters.

Each issue contained 80 pages; as a result certain articles were divided and each part appeared over a number of issues. Air Enthusiast was illustrated with colour and black-and-white photos, diagrams, profiles and three-view drawings. Earlier issues featured cutaway drawings, but these were dropped. The articles provided detail for varieties of aircraft and events.

The magazine was published by three publishing companies and changed editors once, with William Green and Gordon Swanborough as joint editors for 16 years and Ken Ellis as the current sole editor of 16 years also.

The magazine ceased publishing with issue #131, September/October 2007.

References

1974 establishments in the United Kingdom
2007 disestablishments in the United Kingdom
Aviation magazines
Bi-monthly magazines published in the United Kingdom
Transport magazines published in the United Kingdom
Defunct magazines published in the United Kingdom
Magazines established in 1974
Magazines disestablished in 2007
Mass media in Kent